Lydham is a civil parish in Shropshire, England.  It contains 39 listed buildings that are recorded in the National Heritage List for England.  Of these, one is at Grade II*, the middle of the three grades, and the others are at Grade II, the lowest grade.  The parish is to the north and east of the town of Bishops Castle, it contains the village of Lydham, and is otherwise rural.  Most of the listed buildings are farmhouses and farm buildings, houses with associated structures, and cottages.  A high proportion of these are timber framed, or have timber-framed cores, and some have cruck construction.  The other listed buildings include a church, a tomb in the churchyard, the remains of a tower house, and nine milestones.
 

Key

Buildings

References

Citations

Sources

Lists of buildings and structures in Shropshire